V: The New Mythology Suite is the fifth studio album by progressive metal band Symphony X, released on October 10, 2000, through Inside Out Music. It is a concept album dealing with the story of Atlantis, ancient Egyptian mythology, and astrology. The album is the band's first to feature its current and longest lineup, following the arrival of bassist Michael LePond and the return of drummer Jason Rullo.

Overview
As well as being a heavier continuation of the band's established progressive metal style, V also includes a multitude of excerpts from classical composers, including Giuseppe Verdi's Messa da Requiem; Wolfgang Amadeus Mozart's Requiem Mass in D minor; Johann Sebastian Bach's Concerto for Harpsichord in D minor, BWV 1052 and Cantata No. 188; and Béla Bartók's Concerto for Orchestra, Sz. 116, BB 123.

Symphony X's 1998 album Twilight in Olympus was released without a title track; instead, the unfinished compositions from those sessions were later re-worked and distributed in fragments throughout V, particularly on the final track, "Rediscovery (Part II) - The New Mythology". Guitarist Michael Romeo has since confirmed this: "About half of ['Rediscovery (Part II)'] is the song 'Twilight in Olympus', maybe a little more".

Critical reception

Robert Taylor at AllMusic awarded V: The New Mythology Suite three stars out of five, saying "As a whole, V: The New Mythology Suite works and proves that Symphony X has chosen to expand, rather than repeat, history in a genre that appeared to have peaked both creatively and technically." Particular attention was drawn to Romeo's guitar playing style, with Taylor likening it to that of Yngwie Malmsteen, but remarking that it "has proved to be both a blessing and a curse for this gifted guitarist. His chops are certainly comparable, but his sound and style are often identical to his idol." He also criticized some of the music and themes as being "all too familiar", as well as singer Russell Allen's "macho vocal style."

Thom Jurek, also at AllMusic, called it "a solid meld of prog, power, and neoclassical metal that continually pushed their envelope of embracing and employing expert songwriting, arranging, and production techniques."

In 2016, Classic Rock named V in its list "10 Essential Progressive Metal Albums." Metal Hammer also named it on its list of "The 10 Essential Symphonic Metal Albums."

Track listing

Personnel

Russell Allen – lead vocals
Michael Romeo – guitar, background vocals
Michael Pinnella – keyboard,  background vocals
Jason Rullo – drums, percussion
Michael LePond – bass
Technical personnel
Michael Romeo – orchestral arrangement, engineering, production
Michael Pinnella – orchestral arrangement
Eric Rachel – engineering, production
Alan Douches – mastering

References

External links
V: The New Mythology Suite at symphonyx.com
In Review: Symphony X "V" at Guitar Nine Records

Symphony X albums
2000 albums
Metal Blade Records albums
Concept albums
Rock operas

fr:V#Musique